Hemmat Metro Station is a station in Tehran Metro Line 1. It is located next to Hemmat Expressway Between the junctions with Modares Expressway and Shahid Haghani Expressway. It is between Mosalla Metro Station and Shahid Haghani Metro Station. The station is named after Mohammad Ebrahim Hemmat.

Facilities 
The station has a ticket office, escalators, cash machines, bus connections, pay phones, water fountains, and a lost and found.

Tehran Metro stations
Railway stations opened in 2001